Kenneth Warren (23 June 1926 – 16 August 2008) was a Barbadian cricketer. He played in one first-class match for the Barbados cricket team in 1954/55.

See also
 List of Barbadian representative cricketers

References

External links
 

1926 births
2008 deaths
Barbadian cricketers
Barbados cricketers
People from Saint Michael, Barbados